This is a list of Romanian playwrights:

Vasile Alecsandri (1821-1890) 
Gheorghe Asachi (1788-1869)
Aurel Baranga (1913-1979)
Ion Băieșu (1933-1990)
Ion Luca Caragiale (1852-1912)
George Ciprian (1883-1968)
Alexandru Davila (1862-1929)
Puși Dinulescu (born 1942)
Victor Eftimiu (1889-1972)
Paul Everac (1924-2011)
Horia Gârbea (born 1962)
Bogdan Petriceicu Hasdeu (1838-1907)
Eugen Ionescu (1909-1994)
Alexandru Kirițescu (1888-1961)
Petre Locusteanu (1883-1919)
Paul Ioachim (1930-2002)
Tudor Mușatescu (1930-1980)
Victor Ion Popa (1895-1946)
Dumitru Radu Popescu (n. 1935)
Mihail Sebastian (1907-1945)
Dumitru Solomon (1932-2003)
Mihail Sorbul (1885-1966)
Marin Sorescu (1936-1997)
Barbu Ștefănescu Delavrancea (1858-1918)
Matei Vișniec (born 1956)
Ana Maria Bamberger (born 1966)

See also

  List of Romanian writers
 List of Romanian plays
 List of playwrights by nationality and year of birth

Romanian